Coronation Street is a British soap opera, initially produced by Granada Television. Created by writer Tony Warren, Coronation Street first broadcast on ITV on 9 December 1960. The following is a list of characters introduced in the show's twenty-eighth year, by order of first appearance.

Sarah Platt

Sarah-Louise Platt (also Tilsley and Grimshaw) is a fictional character from the British soap opera Coronation Street. She was born on screen during the episode broadcast on 2 February 1987. She was played by Leah King in 1987 and by Lynsay King from 1987 until 8 October 1999 when King opted to leave to focus on her education. Tina O'Brien took over the role on 31 October 1999; she opted to leave in 2007 and made her final on-screen appearance on 30 December 2007. A number of false rumours about O'Brien returning to the role surfaced during her absence from the serial. In October 2014, it was announced that O'Brien had reprised the role, she returned to filming in February 2015 and returned on screen on 30 March 2015.  Sarah's storylines have included a controversial and ground-breaking underage pregnancy which saw her giving birth to Bethany Platt (Amy & Emily Walton, Lucy Fallon) and saw Sarah deal with motherhood in her teens, internet grooming, her friendship with Candice Stowe (Nikki Sanderson), her relationships with Todd (Bruno Langley) and Jason Grimshaw (Ryan Thomas) as well as her sibling rivalry between her and her half-brother David Platt (Thomas Ormson, Jack P. Shepherd). Her exit storyline saw her leave Weatherfield to start a new life with Bethany in Milan. Her return storyline saw her track down Bethany who had run away from home and returned to Weatherfield and begin a relationship with brother David's enemy Callum Logan (Sean Ward). Sarah was a central character in the shows third live episode which was aired to commemorate 60 years of ITV.

Cecil Newton

Cecil Newton was the Brewery boss of Newton & Ridley. He first appeared in 1987 when Alec Gilroy wanted the tenancy of the Rovers Return Inn, as Bet Lynch had used the money she borrowed from Alec to buy the tenancy, but fled to Spain as she could not pay it back. Cecil agreed and also sent Alec out to Spain to search for Bet when they found out she was working in a bar there. Bet married Alec and they successfully applied for the tenancy. Cecil arrived in the pub a year later in 1988 when he suggested to Alec that the rent for staying in the Rovers should be increased, as the establishment was making a lot of money - unsurprisingly, Alec disagreed.

When the Gilroys' were at risk of losing the pub in 1990, due to it being repossessed in preparation for a merge with 1 Coronation Street and conversion into an American theme pub, the local residents campaigned and argued with the brewery. Cecil came out of retirement to put a halt on the plans and told Bet and Alec that the pub was still theirs, belittling project manager Nigel Ridley for his foolish young ideas in the process, and declaring that the Rovers would always remain a working man's pub.

13 years after he was last seen on the street, Bet met him again in November 2003 at the Newton & Ridley function in Blackpool. Cecil fell in love with her and asked her to marry him. However, Cecil's son, Philip, disapproved and tried to split them up and even told Bet that Cecil was going senile. During the ceremony, Cecil collapsed with a heart attack and later died in hospital.

Don Brennan

Donald Michael "Don" Brennan was played by Geoffrey Hinsliff. Don first appeared as a love interest for Ivy Tilsley and they eventually get engaged and married on 13 June 1988. Don had two daughters and a son from his first marriage, but his family never appeared again after the wedding episode. On Christmas Eve 1990, Rosie Webster was born to parents Kevin and Sally in the back of his taxi.

Ivy's erratic behaviour over preserving the memory of her dead son Brian and first husband Bert led Don to look elsewhere for romance. He developed a fascination with local hairdresser Denise Osbourne who he harassed with anonymous phone calls.  He supported Gail and her new husband Martin Platt, to adopt Nick and Sarah. He and Ivy separated in 1992 after Don had an affair, but they reconciled after Don attempted suicide by crashing his taxi and had his leg amputated. Their marriage later ended, and Ivy left Don for a Catholic retreat in the spring of 1994 before her death in August 1995.

Don developed a gambling problem, and ended up owing a lot of money to people - including his sworn enemy Mike Baldwin. After Ivy left Coronation Street, he had a relationship with Josie Clarke, who briefly worked for Mike. They planned to make money by buying his garage from him, only to discover that he had scammed them, and it was worth far less than they had paid for it. Josie left Don when he became obsessed with getting revenge on Mike. In 1997, Don set fire to Mike's sportswear factory then kidnapped Mike's wife Alma and drove his taxi into the canal with her inside - but they were both rescued and survived. Don was arrested and charged with attempted murder, but managed to escape custody and turned up in the Rovers Return Inn; he tried to kill Mike by strangling him with his tie, but local publican Jack Duckworth caught Don in the act and threw him out.

In October 1997, Don tried one last time to kill Mike - this time in Mike's factory. Don tied him up but Angie Freeman whacked Don over the head with a big shoe and Don reappeared in the street in Alma's MG Midget Roadster, which he had stolen, and saw Mike crossing the street by The Kabin. He drove straight at Mike and tried to run him over, but Mike dived out of the way just in time. Don lost control of the car and crashed into the viaduct. Mike escaped unharmed, but Don was killed when the car exploded in a fireball on impact, burning him to death. The resulting stain was evident for many years on the viaduct.

Barry Platt

Barry Platt is the father of Martin Platt. In September 1987, Rita Fairclough called at his house after she spotted Martin in Weatherfield when she had believed him to be in France with Jenny Bradley. Martin was not at home, but Barry confirmed that he had been back in the country for some time. Martin later explained to Rita that Jenny had refused to return with him and had remained in France with some students she befriended. Four years later, Barry attended Martin's wedding to Gail Tilsley, along with his wife Barbara. After the wedding, Barbara stayed on at Gail's house, 33 Hammond Road, to look after Gail and Martin's children while they went on a honeymoon to Abersoch, which Barry and Barbara had booked as a surprise to them which they presented at the reception in the Rovers Return.

Barry was played by John Jardine in 1987 and Richard Conway in 1991. It is not known why the character was recast although it was possibly because of Jardine's role as Randolph Taylor, a character he played in nine episodes in 1990 and reprised in 1992. In his 1991 appearance, the character was credited as Brian Platt.

Amy Burton

Amy Burton was the mother of Vera Duckworth. Amy moves in with Vera and her family, staying in her grandson Terry's freshly-vacated, freshly-decorated back bedroom - to the chagrin of Vera's husband Jack, who wanted to give the bedroom to his fellow decorator Wendy Farmer. Amy arrives from Rusholme, and Jack tries to persuade her that she doesn't want to lose her independence at her age, but Amy is determined to stay with Jack and Vera until she dies.

Amy soon sets her roots in Coronation Street, nagging Jack about his pigeons and developing an addiction for the slot machine in the public bar of the Rovers Return Inn. Vera won't hear a bad word said about Amy, from Jack or her best friend Ivy Tilsley, in face of Amy's abrasive behaviour. This leads to Jack threatening to leave Vera, unless Amy leaves first. Vera is upset that the two don't get on, but refuses to listen to Jack's argument. After pleading with Jack to give Amy another chance, and being refused, Vera decides that it is the lesser of two evils to throw Jack out into the street. The two do, however, reach a compromise and Jack sleeps on the sofa. However, Jack persuades Amy to take on a job and get out from under his feet.

In December 1987, Hilda Ogden quits her job at the Rovers Return Inn, ahead of her retirement from Weatherfield to Hartington, Derbyshire. Against Vera's wishes, Amy takes over Hilda's cleaning job for Bet and Alec Gilroy. This horrifies Jack, as it means he spends his work and home life in the same building as his mother-in-law. Jack tries in vain to get Hilda to take her job back, but Hilda is adamant that she won't return. Meanwhile, Amy causes trouble for the area's elder menfolk, accusing Percy Sugden of lechery, and telling Sam Tindall that he is "gorgeous". However, Amy herself falls into trouble when Sally Webster sees her shoplifting from Alf Roberts's shop, and then giving them to Vera as "presents". Audrey Roberts decides not to pursue the idea when Amy creates a fuss, but trouble doesn't end when Vera accuses Alf and Sally of setting Amy up. Amy's problem worsens, especially when Jack finds out she has been stealing bottles of stout from the Rovers. Jack is in charge of stocktaking and worries that Alec will accuse him of stealing. Vera refuses to believe it, but eventually realises that he is right. When Vera challenges Amy, she is accused of turning on her. Amy accuses Jack of being a terrible husband, and that he deserves to be thrown out. Vera finally sees Amy for what she is and loses her temper; Amy threatens to leave, and Vera calls her out on it. Vera packs Amy's cases and dumps her on Amy's sister, Edie.

In 1991, Amy's other sister Cissie calls Vera, breaking the news that Amy suffered a fatal heart attack while playing a game of bingo. Vera is riddled with guilt, having not visited Amy for some time. Jack tries to get out of the funeral, but makes a genuine effort for Vera at the funeral - but at the wake, he reverts to type and makes cracks about Amy's shoplifting. Cissie reveals to Jack and Vera that the only wish in Amy's will was that she take in Amy's friend, Joss Shackleton, who tells Vera that he is her natural father.

References

1987
, Coronation Street
Coronation Street